Yuanjiang is a county-level city in the Province of Hunan, China, it is under the administration of the prefecture-level city of Yiyang.

Located in the north of the province, the city is bordered to the north by Nan County, to the northeast by Yueyang County, to the southeast by Xiangyin County, to the south by Ziyang District, to the west by Hanshou County. Yuanjiang has 11 towns and two subdistricts under its jurisdiction, the government seat is Qionghu.

Yuanjiang is a city in the drainage basin of Yuan River (Yuan Jiang), it is named after the river, which flows through the city roughly west to east. its most land is located on the northwestern bank of the Dongting Lake.

It is home to Chishan Prison, which holds a number of political prisoners.

Administrative divisions
After an adjustment of township-level divisions of Yuanjiang City on 26 November 2015, Yuanjiang City has 11 towns and two subdistricts under its jurisdiction. they are:

2 subdistricts
 Qionghu, merging Wanzihu Township, Qingyunshan Subdistrict and a portion of the former Qionghu Subdistrict on November 26, 2015.
 Yanzhihu, merging Sanyantang Town and a portion of the former Qionghu Subdistrict on November 26, 2015.

11 towns
 Caowei
 Chapanzhou
 Gonghua
 Huangmaozhou
 Nandashan
 Nanzui
 Qianshanhong
 Sihushan
 Sijihong
 Xinwan, Yuanjiang
 Yangluozhou

Climate

References

External links 

 
Cities in Hunan
County-level divisions of Hunan
Geography of Yiyang